By the Blessing of Satan is the second full-length album by black metal band Behexen.

Track listing

Personnel
Hoath Torog - vocals, lyrics
Gargantum - guitar
Veilroth - guitar
Lunatic - bass
Horns - drums

Additional personnel
Christophe Szpajdel – logo

References

Behexen albums
2004 albums